Salar de Surire Natural Monument is a Chilean Natural Monument located in the Andes, in the Arica y Parinacota Region. It consists mainly of a salt flat and a number of small salt lakes, sheltering several Andean species of wildlife and plants. Arintica volcano towers over the salt flat.

The protected area, along with Lauca National Park and Las Vicuñas National Reserve, were designated a World Biosphere Reserve by UNESCO in 1981, which is called Lauca.

Salar de Surire is one of the Ramsar Wetlands of International Importance under the Ramsar Convention signed in 1971.

See also 

 Pukintika

References

 

Ramsar sites in Chile
Natural monuments of Chile
Protected areas of Arica y Parinacota Region
Surire
Landforms of Arica y Parinacota Region